Kid Acero(which translates as Kid Steel) was the name CIPSA – a regional Mattel subsidiary – used to distribute and sell the popular Big Jim line of action figure toys for the Latin American markets. While most of the toys were exactly the same as the American versions, few of them were retooled or repainted, and sold using different names. These variations are hard to find, even in the local market, and most of the series was focused in two completely different characters: Kid Acero and James Bond. The Kid Acero toy line had its own comic which was published for about five years.

Background
Kid Acero is a 19-year-old fictional sports star, who travels around the world to participate in international sports competitions. He also is a special covert operations agent (and later a superhero), who works for a secret counter intelligence agency which depends of the UN during the Cold War years. Kid Acero is recruited to fight an enemy organization named COBRA whose leader is Doctor Drago, a mad scientist who attempts to conquer the world. Acero has the assistance of two public superheroes code named Invisible and Bionic, and together, they are known as the LOBO Squadron.

The main headquarters of LOBO are deep inside a cavern in the Sonoran Desert. The team has several different vehicles as transportation and back up. They often uses a minijet, a turbojet backpack with retractable wings and a large behemoth vehicle used as a mobile headquarters. Kid Acero also has a trained eagle who helps him in his adventures in the wilderness. The COBRA Organization has his main headquarters in a volcano island located somewhere in the Gulf of Mexico, but also has several minor safety homes around the world.

A similar plot was later used by Mattel in 1999 when they launched a new action figure named Max Steel.

Main characters
Heroes
 Kid Acero – The "basic" good guy leader of the LOBO Squadron. It is widely accepted that Kid Acero is a nickname and not his real name, mostly like Kid Azteca. His real name was not revealed. He has a friendly and healthy personality, and is an expert in all kind of sports. He has a large number of gold medals and trophies due to his dedication to a healthy life and constant workout.
 Invisible Man – Good friend and partner of Kid Acero. Same as his partner, his real name remains unknown, and most characters simply calls him "Invisible". He has a clownish personality, but is also extremely greedy, and is extremely attractive to women. He is repeatedly seen flirting with several women, despite the fact he seems to have a serious relationship with his girlfriend, Malù, who was one of a few black characters at the time who was not heavily stereotyped. Invisible had the largest support cast of the trio, having a large family and several recurring friends (created for the comics). Among the most frequent were his nephew, the "Genius Child Amadeus" (kind of a 12 years old mad scientist); Amadeus` grandfather (apparently, Invisible's uncle), "Abue" (Granny) Gertudis (Invisible's grandmother, and his combat trainer! Still a formidable fighter at 80 years old); plus "Negro" (Black Man) Ezequiel (a seemingly Cuban black man, judging from his stereotypical accent), and "Gordo" (Fatso) Zapìaìn (possibly based on the books editor), and Quicxic, a talking spider monkey, they found in the Chiapas jungle.
 Bionic Man – He was mostly CIPSA's response to the Six Million Dollar Man, and also have two bionic legs and bionic right arm, but not eye. As the other members of the LOBO Squadron, he is just called "Biónico", instead of his real name. He is an ex-astronaut who was reconstructed using bionic implants after an unfortunate accident while landing after a successful mission on space. Owing to his previous soldier training, he has the most serious personality among the members of LOBO, often a bit obnoxious.

Villains
 Doctor Drago – The supreme leader of COBRA Organization. He is no other than Big Jim's Dr. Steel, with a different name. In the comic, he played a role quite similar as Lex Luthor does in Golden Age Superman comics, and it is supposed to be a mad scientist who has large technological resources at his disposal. However, he seemed to have a relatively friendly relationship with Invisible, as he even loaned the hero over 500,000 USD at a time.
 Garfio el Temible – A mercenary hired by Doctor Drago to help him in his quest to conquest the world, weapons specialist and bodyguard. He's a completely new character created using parts of different Big Jim toys, with a hook for a left hand. In the comics, he was quite the dumb sidekick to Doctor Drago.
 Nocton – An alien who joins forces with Doctor Dragon to conquest the world. He has light green alien skin which shows some phosphorescence, specially in the dark. It is not clear from where Nocton came up, except that he is from a distant galaxy, and he is using Doctor Drago as a tool to understand mankind in order to facilitate his conquest.
 Zorak – Exactly the same villain as in the original Big Jim toys. He is a rival of Doctor Drago, and fights Kid Acero following his own twisted purposes, but sometimes teams up with Drago, if it is convenient for his interests. Regionally, he was named "Zorak, the Dual Menace", instead of Double Trouble Zorak.
 Rubicunda Von Kraupp – Created exclusively for the comic, she was the top boss of all American Mafias, weighted about 200 kg, and had the weirdest motive of all the villains in the comic, her only goal was to marry Invisible Man! Even weirder, Doctor Drago fell in love with her at a point, and went to great lengths to win her heart. Seemingly, he did.

Success
Kid Acero was sold from 1974 to 1980. After this date the name of the toy line changed to James Bond until it was retired from the market in 1986.
Comics based on the Kid Acero toyline ran for several years, first Kid Acero alone as a feature in an anthology comic book named "Estrellas del Deporte" (Sports Stars), which originally featured biographies of famous sport idols; then the Lobo Squadron was included, beginning to feature more standard superhero style stories, that ran for several issues; and lastly, each one of the trio received his own comic. Kid Acero's had a heavy bent to sci-fi action adventure, Invisible Man's was more comedic, and Bionic Man's tended to be mystery and horror inclined. Bionic Man's title was the shortest lived, Kid Acero lasted longer, but and the last to be cancelled was Invisible Man.
Kid Acero was the best selling toy for over 4 consecutive years in the Latin American Market.

Kid Acero's origin
Due to the popularity of several local boxing figures in Latin America's sport circuit, and the increasing reject of products considered representatives of the United States' interventionism in the region, Mattel left the marketing decisions to a Mexican licensing company named CIPSA which produced all kind of plastic products, including a large line of plastic containers similar as Tupperware's. This same company also has the local licenses for Hot Wheels and Disney. In 1974 CIPSA decided to change Big Jim's name for Kid Acero (which translates as Kid Steel), and under this name distributed and sell most of the Big Jim toy line.

Most of the toys are exactly the same as in the American market. Only the text on the toy's boxes and the instruction's sheet was changed to Spanish language. Outside the box, there's no way to tell which figures are American and which ones are not, since both were produced in the same factories using the same molds, colors, materials and artwork for the packages. Even Mattel's serial numbers and copyrights were preserved in the molds. This figures were sold mostly across Latin America, but also along the United States South border. Many Big Jim vintage action figures located today in California or Texas may be Kid Acero figures.

The first Kid Acero was the basic Big Jim standard figure from 1974 which came with red shorts and a dumbbell. The initial series of Kid Acero was composed entirely of different versions of Kid Acero in sport, adventure, and jungle outfits, which belongs to the '72 and 73' Big Jim action figures.

The second series introduced a villain named Doctor Drago (known as Dr. Steel in US) as enemy and the exact opposite of Kid Acero. No major changes were done in the toys for a couple of years, and with only few exceptions, the entire line of Big Jim toys were reshipped as Kid Acero's. Among the most notorious exceptions, none other of Big Jim's enemies and friends but Doctor Steel and Double Trouble Zorak were sold in Latin America. Garfio and Nocton were two completely new characters created exclusively for the Mexican market not available anywhere else. Garfio is hard to find even today, especially complete with all his accessories. Two more villains were added later, but as James Bond enemies, not related to Kid Acero's storyline.

The trained eagle included in the American Karzak figure was also added as Kid Acero's companion. This version of Kid was a complete reissue of Karzak with all its original accessories included, but with a Jim's head instead of Karzak's, and the name was changed to "Karnak". The eagle and its training glove were packaged with other adventure figures of Kid Acero later in the series. Karnak and his eagle were featured in one issue of the "Estrellas del Deporte" comic, helping Kid Acero return from a jungle after his plane crashes.

LOBO Squadron VS COBRA Organization

 
In 1979, CIPSA created a Kid Acero sub line named LOBO Squadron, which was originally inspired by Big Jim's P.A.C.K. The same wolf logo used on P.A.C.K. toys was adopted as the team's image. The LOBO Squadron was composed of three heroes, who joined forces to fight against an increasing army of evil characters who are known solely as COBRA, whose leader is no other than Kid Acero's long time adversary, Doctor Drago.

The LOBO Squadron line was mostly composed of retooled toys and repaints. CIPSA took the decision to substitute the right arm of Kid Acero for the one used in the American Torpedo Fist, -a Big Jim's know action figure-, and renamed the toy as Kid Acero Brazo-Bala (Bullet-Arm). For the next 4 years, Bullet-Arm was the most wanted action figure in the Latin American market. Several other versions of Kid Acero were released along the years in the normal line, but none sold as much as the Bullet-Arm version. The real Torpedo Fist never was produced in Latin America.

For some reason, instead of introducing other known Big Jim's villains or friends, CIPSA decided to create their own, but using parts of Big Jim toys. The LOBO Squad initial series introduced Garfio (The Hook), a weapons specialist armed with boomerangs and a bullwhip as associate of Doctor Drago, who has joined forces with Zorak, the Dual Menace. As a result of this new threat, Kid Acero recruits two popular superheroes named Invisible Man and Bionic Man. The LOBO Squadron plot presents all characters as skilled martial arts combatants, and for this reason, most of the figures of this sub line have minimal clothes, mostly black kung fu pants or sport pants. Some characters do not wear shoes at all.

Garfio is in fact a tanned skin Torpedo Fist action figure with hook instead of left arm (but without the spring action as in the Big Jim's Pirate series). His hair was repainted black and was dressed with the same pants and boots as Kid Acero Bullet-Arm in black, but also came with The Whip's accessories and weapons. The original Whip action figure wasn't released in Mexico.

Invisible Man was a clear crystal basic Big Jeff action figure with two removable heads. One head is the normal Big Jeff's with white hair, the other it is intended to be transparent, but looks more like white rubber. He came with a two pieces blue sport suit and gloves. When dressed, the normal head gives the impression he's a normal guy. When undressed, the transparent head and body gives the illusion he's invisible.

Due to the high demand of Kenner's The Six Million Dollar Man action figure, CIPSA released his own version of the same TV character. Its creation was solely a local decision made after the real Six Million Dollar Man action figure, aka "El Hombre Nuclear" in Spanish, and made by Lili Ledy toy company in Mexico, was retired from the Latin American market due to licensing problems in an effort to capitalize the character's current popularity. On its initial run, Bionic Man was a stand-alone action figure with no relation at all with any other CIPSA lines of toys. One year later, a sticker was added in the front of the box with the line "a Kid Acero's friend!". Next year the box was retouched to present him as official part of LOBO. Bionic Man is a Big Jeff basic figure, but dressed in a silver jumper. He has a bionic arm, but instead of the Kung-Fu Grip which was one of the main characteristics of the Six Million Dollar Man action figures, Bionic Man had magnets on his right hand and in several accessories which represents heavy containers and pipe tubes. Using the magnets, Bionic Man carries or pushes away extremely heavy bulks. This action figure does not have a bionic eye with zoom-in features, but in the comic he has it. His most notorious characteristic is it has a translucent right arm, so you can see his internal metallic bones surrounded by cables and circuits.

Several Big Jim figures who shared the same changing face feature were sold as different versions of Zorak, the Dual Menace, including the original Double Trouble and Captain Drake.

In 1980, a last villain was introduced in the series. This time was an alien named Nocton, Master of Darkness (sometimes he is called Noc-Tar in the comic). This one originally was an unproduced Mattel's Space: 1999 model named "Zython". By its second season, Space 1999 suffered a drastic drop in popularity and Zhyton was dropped before being released in the American Market. He was briefly released on Europe though. It is not clear why he was added to COBRA Organization instead of other CIPSA's space related toys. His face resembles an Egyptian pharaoh more than an alien creature. He has light green skin and huge ears. Some Nocton figures had light up features, other figures glows in the dark, and at least one of them had a flying saucer, which looks more like a huge lifesaver which attaches to his hips. Collectors must keep in mind that despite the fact both figures looks almost identical at first sight, Nocton is two inches smaller than Zython. His size was reduced to match the size of all other Big Jim's action figures.

All Vehicles used by LOBO Squadron are black, while all COBRA Organization's are Silver. Most of the Big Jim's originally black colored vehicles were added to the LOBO toys line. The 1979 Big Jim's Lazer-vette is probably the most notorious one. Its package was retouched to substitute Torpedo and Jim from the box' front for Kid Acero and Invisible Man, and the toy was renamed Lobo Laser. The Devil Dune Buggy was repainted silver and released as Cobra-mobile.

The Kid Acero Series was gradually retired from the Latin American market and eventually substituted by the James Bond Series.

The James Bond series
At some point in late 1970s, Mattel started to make presence on its own in the Latin American market instead of licensing its products, and for this reason, many licenses were canceled or reassigned. It is not clear what happened to CIPSA, but the company disappeared short after this decision was made. Most accepted version indicates it was acquired by Mattel. By 1980, Mattel took the decision to relaunch Big Jim as its own line of action figures for the region. This time, all Big Jim's Adventure, Space and Spy series were collected in a James Bond themed series. Same as with Kid Acero, Mattel simply changed the text on the toy's boxes to Spanish and sell the toys under the "James Bond, Agent 007" name instead of Big Jim. All other characteristics remained the same.

Most toys included in the James Bond line were shipped exactly the same as they were on United States. Out of the box, there's no way to tell which ones are or not American since all toys were produced at the same factories.

Same as it happened with LOBO, Mattel focused the entire line in a specific Big Jim model. This time was the '79 Big Jim Secret Agent which came with four exchangeable faces who was renamed "James Bond". Some time later other Spy and Space Big Jim action figures were renamed Bond too. The main villains of this series were Professor O.B.B. and Boris. This last one was renamed Boris Craneo de Acero (Boris SteelSkull). The professor is supposed to be the leader of SPECTRE, while Boris is KGB's prime director.

The James Bond series lasted up to 1986, when it was officially retired from the market.

CIPSA Hot Wheels

A small handful of Hot Wheels have been found with unusual colors along with the Mattel "meatball" replaced with the CIPSA logo.

Playscale figures
Mattel
1970s toys
Action figures